Bob Bryan and Mike Bryan were the defending champions but lost in the final 6–3, 3–6, [10–4] against Brian MacPhie and Nenad Zimonjić.

Seeds

  Mahesh Bhupathi /  Leander Paes (quarterfinals)
  Ellis Ferreira /  Rick Leach (semifinals)
  Bob Bryan /  Mike Bryan (final)
  Brian MacPhie /  Nenad Zimonjić (champions)

Draw

External links
 ATP doubles draw

2002 Kroger St. Jude International
Doubles